is a Japanese former footballer who last played for Thespakusatsu Gunma.

Career
Prior to turning professional, Kukita played football for the University of Tokyo. He retired at the end of the 2019 season.

Career statistics
Updated to 23 February 2018.

References

External links
Profile at Thespakusatsu Gunma

Shingo Kukita – Fagiano Okayama official site 
Shingo Kukita – Yahoo! Japan sports 

1988 births
Living people
University of Tokyo alumni
Association football people from Kumamoto Prefecture
Japanese footballers
J2 League players
J3 League players
Fagiano Okayama players
Matsumoto Yamaga FC players
Thespakusatsu Gunma players
Association football defenders